The Liberty Broadcasting System was a U.S. radio network of the late 1940s and early 1950s founded by Gordon McLendon, which mainly broadcast live recreations of Major League Baseball games, by following the action via Western Union ticker reports.  The sound effects were very realistic, and many listeners were not aware the broadcasters were not announcing the action live.  At that time some major league teams and almost all minor league baseball clubs used recreations of their road games as an economy measure.

Availability
Founded in 1948, the network was mainly in Texas and the southwest but did have 9 affiliates in Oregon, an outlet in Los Angeles, Seattle, and as of Sept. 29, 1950, WHAV in Haverhill, Massachusetts. At one time, it had about 500 radio stations on the line, being second in size only to the Mutual Broadcasting System.

Major League Baseball
It carried various types of programs (for instance, late night band remotes were another feature carried by Liberty) but McLendon, known as the "Old Scotchman", and his daily ball game recreations off the Western Union ticker provided the big money maker. The recreations used himself and future sportscasting stars such as Lindsey Nelson and Jerry Doggett.

It was a live, not recreated, game that provided McLendon and Liberty with their greatest career moment. The Scotchman himself was behind the Liberty mic at the Polo Grounds in New York for the October 3, 1951 finale of the three-game National League play-off series between the New York Giants and Brooklyn Dodgers).

Radio was still the more popular nationwide medium then. With Russ Hodges' famous radio call limited to the Giants' network, McLendon's call is how most Americans heard the NL clincher, including Giant Bobby Thomson's ninth-inning three-run homer into the left-field stands to win it for New York. Excerpts of the McLendon broadcast were highlighted in the 2001 HBO documentary Shot Heard 'Round the World.

Rights fees
According to Time magazine articles of the era, McLendon only paid Major League Baseball $1,000.00 per year for the rights to broadcast the games, but in 1951, the leagues raised the price to $250,000.00 per year, and prohibited broadcasts in any city which had a minor league franchise and in the northeastern and midwestern United States.

Liberty baseball commentators
Bud Blattner (1950–1951)
Jerry Doggett (1950–1951)
Gordon McLendon (1949–1952)
Lindsey Nelson (1950–1951)
Don Wells
Wes Wise

Demise
Sports were the lifeblood of the Liberty Broadcasting System. Restrictions on Major League Baseball broadcasts in minor league franchise areas, as well as bans on National Football League broadcasts within a 75-mile range of league cities, were the one-two blow which ended the network. Since the baseball games were a major draw for both listeners and affiliates, the blackout was a disaster for the fledgling company, which had only posted modest profits during its first few years of operation. More than 100 stations left the network, and, faced with mounting debts, on May 16, 1952, the network ceased broadcasting.

National Basketball Association
Liberty also broadcast NBA games from roughly, the 1950-51 through 1951-52 seasons.

Commentators
Hilliard Gates
Marty Glickman
Johnny Most

Liberty Broadcasting System today
In the mid-2000s, a Spokane, Washington-based broadcaster, the Mutual Broadcasting System (not related to the former network), began using the Mutual and Liberty names on its two stations, KTRW AM 970 Spokane; and KTAC FM 93.9 Ephrata, Washington. These stations have no connections with the original network, but present adult standards, nostalgia, and some Christian programming, using these names as part of the nostalgia-style branding.

References

External links
Gordon McLendon Papers, 1917-1978, in the Southwest Collection/Special Collections Library at Texas Tech University

Defunct radio networks in the United States
Defunct radio stations in the United States
Mass media companies established in 1948
Major League Baseball on the radio
National Basketball Association on the radio
Mass media companies disestablished in 1952
Radio_stations_disestablished_in_1952 
Radio stations established in 1948